The DTS Music Disc (official name), DTS Audio CD or 5.1 Music Disc is an audio Compact Disc that contains music in one of various possible surround sound configurations. The specification permits discrete channel configurations from 2.0 (L, R) to 6.1 (L, R, C, LFE, Ls, Rs, Cs), although 5.1 (L, R, C, LFE, Ls, Rs) is the most common. Physically, a DTS Music Disc conforms to the Red Book standard; however a DTS bitstream, based on the Coherent Acoustics compression algorithm, is actually encapsulated in each PCM audio track. This configuration permits any non-DTS enabled player to output multi-channel audio when connected to an external DTS-compliant processor (e.g. a typical AV receiver) via a digital interface like S/PDIF or HDMI, provided that the player does not modify the bitstream internally.

Although the DTS audio track is read at the same fixed bitrate as 16-bit linear PCM (1,411 kbit/s), only 14 bits (1,234 kbit/s) are used for the encoded data stream; the two highest-order bits are always zero. This has the effect of attenuating the noise that would result (by roughly 12 dB) should one attempt to play a DTS Music Disc with a non-DTS system, thereby reducing the chance of speaker damage. This is, of course,  not an issue for players with internal DTS decoders, such as some DVD-Audio and Blu-ray players; these devices will output a properly decoded audio signal through their analogue ports.

Although all compliant DTS decoders support surround configurations of up to 5.1 channels, only a full DTS ES (DTS Extended Surround) decoder will fully decode discs with 6.0 or 6.1 channels of audio. DTS ES comes in two versions: DTS ES Matrix and DTS ES Discrete. Depending on the disc and decoder used, the Cs (center surround) channel will either be derived from the Ls and Rs of a conventional 5.1 track via matrix decoding, or exist as a fully discrete digital extension to a 5.0 or 5.1 core. In either case, backward compatibility is maintained with non-ES decoders.

References

Audiovisual introductions in 1997
Compact disc